On the Beat is a Canadian film by director Charles-Olivier Michaud, released on 10 August 2011. The lead actors are Nico Archambault in the role of Marco Polo Painchaud and Mylène Saint-Sauveur in the role of Delphine Lamarre. Many of the supporting cast of dancers were friends  of Archambault. Sixty dancers from Montreal, Toronto, Calgary, and Vancouver took part in the film. The dances were designed by Archambault and his girlfriend/future wife Wynn Holmes.

Plot
Sur le rythme is a romantic comedy about the world of dance. Delphine Lamarre (Mylène Saint-Sauveur), a 20-year-old student has to choose between medicine, her parents' (Paul Doucet and Marina Orsini) wish, and her dreams of a career in dancing.

Cast 
Mylène Saint-Sauveur as Delphine Lamarre
Nico Archambault as Marco Polo Painchaud
France Castel as Dorothée "Mamie" Lamarre
Paul Doucet as Denis Lamarre
Marina Orsini as Marie Lamarre
Géraldine Charbonneau as Sophie Painchauld
Trevor Hayes as Billy Hollinger
Lina Roessler as Sarah Greene
Julien Hurteau as Félix
Heather Peace as classmate of Sarah
Robert Knowles as classmate of Sarah
Jessica Lalitto as classmate of Sarah
Jesse Robb as Chris
Davy Boisvert as Spike
Camille Vanasse as Johanne
Alexia Gourd as Julianne Latulipe
Shana Troy as Fiona
Roxanne Mignacco as Annabelle Potvin
Danny Amaral de Matos as Patrice Beaulieu
Miles Faber as dancer in New York audition
Handy Jacinthe as New York dancer

References

External links 
 
 

2011 films
Films shot in Montreal
Films directed by Charles-Olivier Michaud
French-language Canadian films
Canadian dance films
2010s Canadian films